Kristina Inhof (born 1 October 1988) is an Austrian television presenter and sports journalist at ORF.

Early life 
Inhof was born in Vienna and grew up in Lower Austria. During her school years she played handball for several years at Hypo Niederösterreich. In 2008 she completed her school leaving exam at the Vienna Business School. Shortly thereafter, she began her studies in sports science with a focus on sport management at the University of Vienna. During this time, she also lived for six months in Gran Canaria, where she completed a semester abroad at the University of Las Palmas de Gran Canaria (ULPGC). Already during her studies she completed various internships at media companies such as Radio 88.6, Kronen Zeitung or Austria 9. In October 2012 Inhof completed her studies with a bachelor's degree. She is also a graduate of the WIFI Media Academy.

Career 
In 2009, Inhof was in front of a camera for the first time. In addition to her work at W24, in 2012 she was hired by the Austrian TV broadcaster Puls 4 for the broadcast of the UEFA Champions League. This moderated them together with Christian Nehiba and Frank Schinkels.

At W24, Inhof also took over the format Immobilien für Wien, the main evening show Best of and the moderation of the programme presentations of the station.

For several months in 2015, she joined the moderator team of Sky Sport News HD and presented the sports news several times a week. At the same time, Inhof moderated together with Andi Knoll on Die große Chance der Chöre in ORF eins.

In 2016, Inhof worked exclusively for the ORF, where she presented the football department, which includes programmes from the Champions League, Bundesliga, Austrian Football First League, Austrian Cup and summaries of games of the Austria national football team. She was also part of the ORF team at the UEFA Euro 2016 in France. In addition, she presented again in 2016 with Andi Knoll on Die große Chance der Chöre. In 2017, Inhof announced points in the finals of the Eurovision Song Contest Austria, replacing Katharina Bellowitsch as the point leader.

In addition to her TV appearances, Inhof is active as an event presenter. In 2013 and 2014, she hosted the final of the EHF Champions League in the Lanxess Arena. Apart from the sporting area, she also leads through galas and corporate events.

Personal life 
Inhof lives in Lower Austria.

She is a fan of the London football club Arsenal F.C. and has been to the Emirates Stadium several times.

Inhof speaks German as well as English and Spanish fluently.

References

External links 

 
 
Mehr Frauenpower im ORF Sport – Inhof verstärkt Fußballteam 
Kristina Inhof-Eine Blondine mit Durchblick in NÖN 
Sky Deutschland: Stecker und Inhof neu dabei, Fürther steigt auf 
Inhof und Knoll moderieren "Die große Chance der Chöre" 
"Mal sehen, wie die Herren reagieren" 

Austrian television presenters
Austrian women television presenters
University of Vienna alumni
ORF (broadcaster) people
1988 births
Journalists from Vienna
Austrian women journalists
Living people